The tropical house gecko, Afro-American house gecko or cosmopolitan house gecko (Hemidactylus mabouia) is a species of house gecko native to sub-Saharan Africa.  It is also currently found in North, Central and South America and the Caribbean, where it has been inadvertently introduced by humans.

Description
This species can attain a maximum length, from snout to vent, of 12.7 cm (5 in). Being nocturnal, it has very large eyes which are useful in spotting prey in low light conditions. It can change color (slowly) from light brown to a darker brown to better match its surroundings.

Diet
Its diet is varied, and includes animals such as isopods, centipedes, spiders, scorpions, cockroaches, beetles, moths, flies, mosquitoes, anoles and other geckos with the most important element being Orthoptera species.

Vocalization
As with many gecko species, it has the ability to vocalize. Its vocalizations range from quiet peeps to rapid short squeaking sounds. They may be heard most easily on a quiet night when they are sitting near an open window.

Habitat
The tropical house gecko can be found predominantly in urban locations.

Behavior
Tropical house geckos are mainly nocturnal and are voracious hunters of nocturnal flying and crawling insects. They have learned to wait near outside wall-mounted lighting fixtures so as to catch the insects that are drawn to the light.

Human impact
In some Caribbean cultures it is considered good luck to have a tropical house gecko residing in one's home, and certainly they do eat a lot of household insect pests. The gecko will usually confine its feces to one area of a home, but if that area happens to be a pale-colored carpet, drapes, or any other easily stained surface, the stains are not easily removed, and the droppings have to be physically scooped up as well.

Despite being harmless, the common house gecko or 'woodslave' is considered by some in Trinidad & Tobago to be a bad omen and to have a poisonous touch. This is an old superstition and, in actuality, the house gecko is harmless and very useful due to hunting spiders and cockroaches.

References

Further reading
Boulenger, G.A. 1885. Catalogue of the Lizards in the British Museum (Natural History). Second Edition. Volume I. Geckonidae ... London: Trustees of the British Museum (Natural History). (Taylor and Francis, printers). xii + 436 pp. + Plates I- XXXII. (Hemidactylus mabouia, pp. 122–123).
Duméril, A.M.C., and G. Bibron. 1836. Erpétologie Générale ou Histoire Naturelle Complète des Reptiles, Tome troisième. [= General Herpetology or Complete Natural History of the Reptiles, Volume 3 ]. Paris: Librairie Encyclopédique Roret. iv + 517 pp. (Hemidactylus mabouia, pp. 362–363).
Moreau de Jonnès, [A]. 1818. "Monographie du Mabouia des murailles, ou Gecko Mabouia des Antilles." Bulletin des Sciences par la Société Philomatique de Paris, Series 3, 5: 138-139. ("Gecko Mabouia", new species).
Schwartz, A., and R. Thomas. 1975. A Check-list of West Indian Amphibians and Reptiles. Special Publication No. 1. Pittsburgh: Carnegie Museum of Natural History. 216 pp. (Hemidactylus mabouia, p. 124).

External links
 
 Geckos May Be Famously Sticky, but Here's What Stumps Them

Hemidactylus
Geckos of Africa
Reptiles of Uganda
Reptiles of the Caribbean
Reptiles of the Dominican Republic
Reptiles described in 1818
Taxa named by Alexandre Moreau de Jonnès